Pha̍k-fa-sṳ is an orthography similar to Pe̍h-ōe-jī and used to write Hakka, a variety of Chinese. Hakka is a whole branch of Chinese, and Hakka dialects are not necessarily mutually intelligible with each other, considering the large geographical region. This article discusses a specific variety of Hakka. The orthography was invented by the Presbyterian church in the 19th century. The Hakka New Testament published in 1924 is written in this system.

Writing system
Pha̍k-fa-sṳ uses a modified Latin alphabet (an additional double-dotted ṳ for the close central unrounded vowel //) and some diacritics for tones. A single hyphen is added to indicate a compound.

History
Shortly after the missionaries of the Basel Missionary Society, Reverend Theodore Hamberg and Rudolf Lechler arrived in China in 1847, Hamberg and his colleagues began compiling the Hakka to English to Hakka to German dictionaries. Lechler was initially allocated the evangelizing work amongst the Shantou population, but because of opposition from the local authorities there, the Shantou mission was abandoned and he joined Hamberg in the mission work with the Hakka in 1852. After Hamberg died unexpectedly in 1854, Lechler continued with the dictionary work together with fellow missionary colleagues for over fifty years. During that time, Reverend Charles Piton also made several revisions to the dictionary.

The first publication of Romanized Hakka in Pha̍k-fa-sṳ was done by Donald MacIver (1852-1910) in 1905 at Shantou and was titled A Chinese-English dictionary : Hakka-dialect, as spoken in Kwang-tung province. He noted that some of the content was based on the dictionaries compiled by the previous Basel missionaries. However, the latter had used the Lepsius romanization, which was different from Pha̍k-fa-sṳ. MacIver made the changes to the dictionary, but he realised that Hakka vocabulary written by the Basel missionaries belonged to the Hakka dialects of southwestern Guangdong Province: Haifeng County, Lufeng County, Jiexi County and Wuhua County. On the other hand, MacIver's Hakka vocabulary was extracted from the northeastern part of Guangdong Province such as Jiaying Prefecture (now Meizhou).

Current system

Letters

Consonants

Vowels

Tone marks
Listed below are tone marks of Pha̍k-fa-sṳ with tone value of Sixian and Hailu dialects of Taiwanese Hakka:

Comparison of Chinese and Taiwanese Pha̍k-fa-sṳ
Comparisons were made between The Hakka New Testament (1924) and the Hakka Bible: Today's Taiwan Hakka Version (2012). The former was published in Shantou, China, while the latter was published in Taiwan.

Initials
Below are rules for switching between Chinese and Taiwanese Pha̍k-fa-sṳ:

Tone marks
The table below compares the tone marks of Chinese Pha̍k-fa-sṳ, Taiwanese Pha̍k-fa-sṳ, and Pe̍h-ōe-jī of Southern Min.

Notes:
Taiwanese Hakka does not differentiate between 陰上 (yīnshǎng) and 陽上 (yángshǎng). Certain dialects (but not the standard) of Taiwanese Hokkien does have yángshǎng (ǎ).
Sixian Hakka does not differentiate between 陰去 (yīnqù) and 陽去 (yángqù), but Hailu does have yángqù (å).

See also
Pe̍h-ōe-jī
Hagfa Pinyim
Hakka Bible: Today's Taiwan Hakka Version

References

External links
Chinese to Hakka Dictionary Online (in the Siyen dialect)
English to Hakka Dictionary Online
Online Chinese Character to Hakka Pha̍k-fa-sṳ Transliterator

Hakka Chinese
Languages of Taiwan
Romanization of Chinese
Latin-script orthographies